Emam Gholi Khan Haji Ilkhani (1825 Tehran - 1899 Ardal) was the great ilkhan of Bakhtiari tribe. He was second son of Jafar Gholi Khan Doraki and Bibi Shah Pasand. After killing his older brother, Hossein Gholi Khan ilkhani The great ilkhan of Bakhtiari tribe in isphahan He became The great ilkhan in Ardal, Iran. On 1899 The great ilkhan of Bakhtiari tribe death at Bakhtiari's government Center Ardal's Castle.

External links
 Official website of the Bakhtiari family

1825 births
1899 deaths
Ilkhanate
Iranian royalty